Schistometopum thomense is a species of amphibian in the family Dermophiidae, endemic to São Tomé and Ilhéu das Rolas. It is found in most soils on São Tomé, from tropical moist lowland forests to coastal coconut plantations. It is absent only from the driest northern areas of the island. It is typically around 30 cm (12 in) in length, and is often bright yellow. The size of S. thomense can vary throughout São Tomé, however, and it is the only known caecilian to follow Bergmann's rule, which states that a decreasing temperature due to factors such as increasing altitude will cause an increase in the body size of endothermic vertebrate species. The island of São Tomé is a massive shield volcano, and it therefore has differing altitudes throughout the island, potentially resulting in the size diversity of S. thomense.  This species may be referred to as the São Tomé caecilian (with various spellings of the island's name), as the Agua Ize caecilian, or as the island caecilian, or by the local name of cobra bobo.

Synonyms
The species has been described under the following synonyms:
Siphonops thomensis — Bocage, 1873
Siphonops brevirostris — Peters, 1874
Dermophis brevirostris — Peters 1880
Dermophis thomensis — Peters, 1880
Schistometopum thomense — Parker, 1941
Schistometopum ephele — Taylor, 1965
Schistometopum brevirostris — Taylor, 1965
Schistometopum brevirostre — Taylor, 1968

References

thomense
Endemic fauna of São Tomé Island
Ilhéu das Rolas
Amphibians described in 1873
Taxonomy articles created by Polbot